Terry Bouhraoua (born 29 August 1987) is a French rugby union and rugby union sevens player who plays for the  France national rugby sevens team. His position is scrum-half.

Bouhraoua was born in Châteaudun, France. He began professional rugby in 2005 for Stade Français and left the French capital four years later for AS Béziers Hérault, which played in Fédérale 1 (third division).

International 
In 2010 he signed a contract with the French Rugby Federation (FFR) to play in French national rugby sevens team. Since 2014, he has been the captain of the team.
Bouhraoua made his international debut in rugby sevens during the 2010 Dubai Sevens. He played the 2016 Olympic Games, ended by Japan in Cup quarter final (10-12). He was the top scorer of the competition with 43 points, one more than the South African Cecil Afrika, and top try scorer of his team with four tries.

Awards 
 Top try scorer in 2015 Dubai Sevens (8 tries)
 Top scorer in 2016 Olympic Games (43 points) 
 Top try scorer in 2016 South Africa Sevens (10 tries)

References

External links 
 
 
 
 
 

1987 births
Living people
People from Châteaudun
CA Brive players
Stade Français players
French rugby union players
Rugby union scrum-halves
Rugby sevens players at the 2016 Summer Olympics
Olympic rugby sevens players of France
France international rugby sevens players
French sportspeople of Algerian descent
Sportspeople from Eure-et-Loir
AS Béziers Hérault players